The onocentaur (from ) is a legendary creature from Ancient folklore and  Medieval bestiaries.

Description 
The onocentaur is similar to the centaur, but part human, part donkey. However, unlike a centaur, which is portrayed with four legs, the onocentaur is often portrayed with only two legs. As with many liminal beings, the onocentaur's nature is one of conflict between its human and animal components.

The first known mention was in reign of Ptolemy II Philadelphus by an officer named Pythagoras, as quoted by Claudius Aelianus in De Natura Animalium. Aelian as well uses the term onokentaura for description of the female form. He interpreted the onocentaur as: "its body resembles that of an ass, its colour is ashen but inclines to white beneath the flanks. It has a human chest with teats and a human face surrounded by thick hair. It may use its arms to seize and hold things but also to run. It has a violent temper and does not endure capture."

The Life of Antony written by Athanasius of Alexandria mentions a "beast like a man to the thighs but having legs and feet like those of an ass", though it does not use the term onocentaur.

As biblical corpus 

As should be verifiable using a suitable concordance to the Bible, the Septuagint translators used the word onokentauros or ("onocentaur") four times in the Book of Isaiah.
 
Once it is used without any corresponding Hebrew word, in verse 34.11. Twice, in verses 13:22 ("and onocentaurs will settle there and hedgehogs will make nests in their homes. It comes quickly and does not delay") and 34:14 ("and the spirits will meet with the onocentaurs and howl one to another, and the onocentaurs will stop because they have found rest") to translate some sort of "island beast(s)" called  (pl.  ) in the original Hebrew, possibly jackal or hyena. The second instance in the same verse (Is. 24:14) translates , probably a female demon.

Jerome's translation of the Septuagint and Vetus Latina versions into the Late Latin standard version, the Vulgate, preserved this interpretation. John Wycliffe's early English-language translation of the Bible did not use the word "onocentaur", but instead glossed the term as: "wondurful beestis, lijk men in the hiyere part and lijk assis in the nethir part". The later King James Version translates the word as "satyr".

See also 
 Ichthyocentaur

References 
Citations

Bibliography

External links 

 Ruby onocentaur: Six poems (1975) by Jeremy Reed

Greek legendary creatures
Mythological hybrids
Roman legendary creatures
Legendary mammals
Centaurs